Keshwar may refer to:

Tatum Keshwar (b. 1981), South African model
Istgah-e Keshvar, a village in Iran